Trait leadership is defined as integrated patterns of personal characteristics that reflect a range of individual differences and foster consistent leader effectiveness across a variety of group and organizational situations (Zaccaro, Kemp, & Bader, 2004; Zaccaro 2007). The theory of trait leadership is developed from early leadership research which focused primarily on finding a group of heritable attributes that differentiate leaders from nonleaders. Leader effectiveness refers to the amount of influence a leader has on individual or group performance, followers’ satisfaction, and overall effectiveness (Derue, Nahrgang, Wellman, & Humphrey, 2011; de Vries 2012). Many scholars have argued that leadership is unique to only a select number of individuals and that these individuals possess certain immutable traits that cannot be developed (Galton, 1869). Although this perspective has been criticized immensely over the past century, scholars still continue to study the effects of personality traits on leader effectiveness. Research has demonstrated that successful leaders differ from other people and possess certain core personality traits that significantly contribute to their success. Understanding the importance of these core personality traits that predict leader effectiveness can help organizations with their leader selection, training, and development practices (Derue et al., 2011).

History of research 
The emergence of the concept of trait leadership can be traced back to Thomas Carlyle's "great man" theory, which stated that "The History of the World [...] was the Biography of Great Men" (Carlyle 1841, p. 17). Subsequent commentators interpreted this view to conclude that the forces of extraordinary leadership
shape history (Judge, Piccolo, & Kosalka, 2009). Influenced by Carlyle, Francis Galton in Hereditary Genius (1869) took this idea further. Galton found that leadership was a unique property of extraordinary individuals and suggested that the traits that leaders possessed were immutable and could not be developed. Throughout the early 1900s, the study of leadership focused on traits.  Cowley (1931) commented that the approach to the research of leadership has usually been and should always be through the study of traits (Cowley, 1931). Many theorists, influenced by Carlyle and Galton, believed that trait leadership depended on the personal qualities of the leader, however, they did not assume that leadership only resides within a select number of people (Judge, Bono, Ilies, & Gerhardt, 2002). This trait perspective of leadership was widely accepted until the late 1940s and early 1950s, when researchers began to deem personality traits insufficient in predicting leader effectiveness (Stogdill, 1948; Mann, 1959).

In 1948, Stogdill stated that leadership exists between persons in a social situation, and that persons who are leaders in one situation may not necessarily be leaders in other situations. This statement has been cited ubiquitously as sounding the death knell for trait-leadership theory. Furthermore, scholars commented that any trait's effect on leadership behavior will always depend on the situation (Huges, Ginnett, & Curphy, 1996; Yukl & Van Fleet, 1992).  Subsequently, leadership stopped being characterized by individual differences, and behavioral and situational analyses of leadership took over and began to dominate the field of leadership research (Bass, 1990). During this period of widespread rejection, several dominant theories took the place of trait leadership theory, including Fiedler's (1967) contingency model, Blake and Mouton's (1964) managerial grid, Hersey and Blanchard's (1969) situational leadership model, and transformational and transactional leadership models (Avolio, Sosik, Jung, & Berson, 2003; Bass, 1985; Podsakoff, MacKenzie, Moorman, & Fetter, 1990).

Despite the growing criticisms of trait leadership, the purported basis for the rejection of trait-leadership models began to encounter strong challenges (Kenny & Zaccaro, 1983; Lord, DeVader, & Alliger, 1986) in the 1980s. Zaccaro (2007) pointed out that even Stogdill's (1948) review, although cited as evidence against leader traits, contained conclusions supporting that individual differences could still be predictors of leader effectiveness. With an increasing number of empirical studies directly supporting trait leadership (Judge et al., 2002; Judge, Colbert, & Ilies, 2004), traits have reemerged in the lexicon of the scientific research into leadership. In recent years, the research about leader traits has made some progress in identifying a list of personality traits that are highly predictive of leader effectiveness. Additionally, to account for the arguments for situational leadership, researchers have used the round-robin design methodology to test whether certain individuals emerge as leaders across multiple situations (Kenny & Zaccaro, 1983). Scholars have also proposed new ways of studying the relationship of certain traits to leader effectiveness. For instance, many suggest the integration of trait and behavioral theories to understand how traits relate to leader effectiveness (Derue et al., 2011). Furthermore, scholars have expanded their focus and have proposed looking at more malleable traits (ones susceptible to development) in addition to the traditional dispositional traits as predictors of leader effectiveness (Hoffman, Woehr, Maldagen-Youngjohn, & Lyons, 2011). Context is only now beginning to be examined as a contributor to leaders' success and failure. Productive narcissism|Productive narcissistic CEOs like Steven Jobs of Apple and Jack Welch of GE have demonstrated a gift for creating innovation, whereas leaders with idealized traits prove more successful in more stable environments requiring less innovation and creativity (Maccoby, 2007).

Cultural fit and leadership value can be determined by evaluating an individual's own behavior, perceptions of their employees and peers, and the direct objective results of their organization, and then comparing these findings against the needs of the company (Bass & Riggio, 2006).

Leader traits 
The investigations of leader traits are always by no means exhaustive (Zaccaro, 2007). In recent years, several studies have made comprehensive reviews about leader traits that have been historically studied (Derue et al., 2011; Hoffman et al., 2011; Judge et al., 2009; Zaccaro, 2007). There are many ways that traits related to leadership can be categorized; however, the two most recent categorizations have organized traits into (1) demographic vs. task competence vs. interpersonal and (2) distal (trait-like) vs. proximal (state-like):

Demographic, task competence and interpersonal leadership 
Based on a recent review of the trait leadership literature, Derue and others (2011) stated that most leader traits can be organized into three categories: demographic, task competence, and interpersonal attributes. For the demographics category, gender has by far received the most attention in terms of leadership; however, most scholars have found that male and female leaders are both equally effective. Task competence relates to how individuals approach the execution and performance of tasks (Bass & Bass, 2008). Hoffman grouped intelligence, Conscientiousness, Openness to Experience, and Emotional Stability into this category. Lastly, interpersonal attributes are related to how a leader approaches social interactions. According to Hoffman and others (2011), Extraversion and Agreeableness should be grouped into this category.

Distal (trait-like) vs. proximal (state-like) 
Recent research has shifted from focusing solely on distal (dispositional/trait-like) characteristics of leaders to more proximal (malleable/state-like) individual differences often in the form of knowledge and skills (Hoffman et al., 2011). The hope is that emergence of proximal traits in trait leadership theory will help researchers answer the ancient question: are leaders born or made?  Proximal individual differences suggest that the characteristics that distinguish effective leaders from non-effective leaders are not necessarily stable through the life-span, implying that these traits may be able to be developed. Hoffman and others (2011) examined the effects of distal vs. proximal traits on leader effectiveness. He found that distal individual differences of achievement motivation, energy, flexibility, dominance, honesty/integrity, self-confidence, creativity, and charisma were strongly correlated with leader effectiveness. Additionally, he found that the proximal individual differences of interpersonal skills, oral communication, written communication, management skills, problem solving skills, and decision making were also strongly correlated with leader effectiveness. His results suggested that on average, distal and proximal individual differences have a similar relationship with effective leadership (Hoffman et al., 2011).

Trait-leadership model 

Zaccaro and colleagues (2004) created a model to understand leader traits and their influence on leader effectiveness/performance. This model, shown in the figure below, is based on other models of leader traits and leader effectiveness/performance (Mumford, Zaccaro, Harding, Fleishman, & Reiter-Palmon, 1993; Mumford, Zaccaro, Harding, et al., 2000) and rests on two basic premises about leader traits. The first premise is that leadership emerges from the combined influence of multiple traits as opposed to emerging from the independent assessment of traits. Zaccaro (2001) argued that effective leadership is derived from an integrated set of cognitive abilities, social capabilities, and dispositional tendencies, with each set of traits adding to the influence of the other. The second premise is that leader traits differ in their proximal influence on leadership. This model is a multistage one in which certain distal attributes (i.e. dispositional attributes, cognitive abilities, and motives/values) serve as precursors for the development of proximal personal characteristics (i.e. social skills, problem solving skills and expertise knowledge) (Ackerman & Humphreys, 1990; Barrick, Mitchell, & Stewart, 2003; Chen, Gully, Whiteman, & Kilcullen, 2000; Schneider, Hough, & Dunnette, 1996; Kanfer, 1990, 1992; Mumford, Zaccaro, Harding, et al., 2000). Adopting this categorization approach and based on several comprehensive reviews/meta-analysis of trait leadership in recent years (Derue et al., 2011; Hoffman et al., 2010; Judge et al., 2009; Zaccaro, 2007), we tried to make an inclusive list of leader traits (Table 1). However, the investigations of leader traits are always by no means exhaustive (Zaccaro, 2007).

Other models of trait leadership 
Multiple models have been proposed to explain the relationship of traits to leader effectiveness.  Recently, integrated trait leadership models were put forward by summarizing the historical findings and reconciling the conflict between traits and other factors such as situations in determining effective leadership (Derue et al., 2011; Judge et al., 2009; Zaccaro, 2007). In addition to Zaccaro's Model of Leader Attributes and Leader Performance described in the previous section, two other models have emerged in recent trait leadership literature. The Leader Trait Emergence Effectiveness (LTEE) Model, created by Judge and colleagues (2009), combines the behavioral genetics and evolutionary psychology theories of how personality traits are developed into a model that explains leader emergence and effectiveness. Additionally, this model separates objective and subjective leader effectiveness into different criterion. The authors created this model to be broad and flexible as to diverge from how the relationship between traits and leadership had been studied in past research. Another model that has emerged in the trait leadership literature is the Integrated Model of Leader Traits, Behaviors, and Effectiveness (Derue et al., 2011). This model combines traits and behaviors in predicting leader effectiveness and tested the mediation effect of leader behaviors on the relationship between leader traits and effectiveness. The authors found that some types of leader behaviors mediated the effect between traits and leader effectiveness. The results of Derue and colleagues' (2011) study supported an integrated trait-behavioral model that can be used in future research.

Criticisms of trait leadership 
Although there has been an increased focus by researchers on trait leadership, this theory remains one of the most criticized theories of leadership. Over the years, many reviewers of trait leadership theory have commented that this approach to leadership is “too simplistic” (Conger & Kanugo, 1998), and “futile” (House & Aditya, 1997). Additionally, scholars have noted that trait leadership theory usually only focuses on how leader effectiveness is perceived by followers (Lord et al., 1986) rather than a leader's actual effectiveness (Judge et al., 2009). Because the process through which personality predicts the actual effectiveness of leaders has been relatively unexplored (Ng, Ang, & Chan, 2008), these scholars have concluded that personality currently has low explanatory and predictive power over job performance and cannot help organizations select leaders who will be effective (Morgeson & Ilies, 2007). Furthermore, Derue and colleagues (2011) found that leader behaviors are more predictive of leader effectiveness than are traits.

Another criticism of trait leadership is its silence on the influence of the situational context surrounding leaders (Ng et al., 2008). Stogdill (1948) found that persons who are leaders in one situation may not be leaders in another situation. Complementing this situational theory of leadership, Murphy (1941) wrote that leadership does not reside in the person, and it usually requires examining the whole situation. In addition to situational leadership theory, there has been growing support for other leadership theories such as transformational, transactional, charismatic, and authentic leadership theories. These theories have gained popularity because they are more normative than the trait and behavioral leadership theories (Schaubroeck, Lam, & Cha, 2007).

Further criticisms include the failure of studies to uncover a trait or group of traits that are consistently associated with leadership emergence or help differentiate leaders from followers (Kenny & Zacarro, 1983). Additionally, trait leadership's focus on a small set of personality traits and neglect of more malleable traits such as social skills and problem solving skills has received considerable criticism.  Lastly, trait leadership often fails to consider the integration of multiple traits when studying the effects of traits on leader effectiveness (Zaccaro, 2007).

Implications for practice 
Given the recent increase in evidence and support of trait leadership theory (Ng et al., 2008), scholars have suggested a variety of strategies for human resource departments within organizations.  Companies should use personality traits as selection tools for identifying emerging leaders (Ng et al., 2008). These companies, however, should be aware of the individual traits that predict success in leader effectiveness as well as the traits that could be detrimental to leader effectiveness. For example, while Derue and colleagues (2011) found that individuals who are high in Conscientiousness, Extraversion, and Agreeableness are predicted to be more likely to be perceived as successful in leadership positions, Judge, Woolf, Hurst, & Livingston (2006) wrote that individuals who are high in narcissism are more likely to be a liability in certain jobs. Narcissism is just one example of a personality trait that should be explored further by HR practitioners to ensure they are not placing individuals with certain traits in the wrong positions.

Complementing the suggestion that personality traits should be used as selection tools, Judge and colleagues (2002) found that the Big Five Personality traits were more strongly related to leadership than intelligence. This finding suggests that selecting leaders based on their personality is more important than selecting them based on intelligence. If organizations select leaders based on intelligence, it is recommended by Judge and colleagues (2002) that these individuals be placed in leadership positions when the stress level is low and the individual has the ability to be directive.

Another way in which HR practitioners can use the research on trait leadership is for leadership development programs. Although inherent personality traits (distal/trait-like) are relatively immune to leadership development, Zaccaro (2007) suggested that proximal traits (state-like) will be more malleable and susceptible to leadership development programs. Companies should use different types of development interventions to stretch the existing capabilities of their leaders (Zaccaro, 2007).

There is also evidence to suggest that Americans have an Extrovert Ideal, which dictates that people, most times unconsciously, favor the traits of extroverted individuals and suppress the qualities unique to introverts (Cain, 2012). Susan Cain's research points to a transition sometime around the turn of the century during which we stopped evaluating our leaders based on character and began judging them instead based on personality. While both extroverted and introverted leaders have been shown to be effective, we have a general proclivity towards extroverted traits, which when evaluating trait leadership, could skew our perception of what's important.

See also 

 Leadership
 Charisma
 Trait theory
 Big Five personality traits
 Personality psychology
 Individual differences psychology
 Leadership development
 Situational leadership theory
 Three Levels of Leadership model
 Transformational leadership
 Transactional leadership
 Human resources
 Fiedler contingency model

Footnotes

References 

 Ackerman, P. L., & Humphreys, L. G. (1990). Individual differences in industrial and organizational psychology. Handbook of industrial and organizational psychology, Vol. 1 (2nd ed.). (pp. 223–282). Palo Alto, CA, US: Consulting Psychologists Press.
 Arvey, R. D., Rotundo, M., Johnson, W., Zhang, Z., & McGue, M. (2006). The determinants of leadership role occupancy: Genetic and personality :factors. The Leadership Quarterly, 17, 1-20.
 Avolio, B. J., Sosik, J. J., Jung, D. I., & Berson, Y. (2003). Leadership models, methods, and applications. Handbook of psychology: Industrial and organizational psychology,Vol. 12. (pp. 277–307). Hoboken, NJ, US: John Wiley & Sons Inc.
 Barrick, M. R., Stewart, G. L., & Piotrowski, M. (2002). Personality and job performance: Test of the mediating effects of motivation among :sales representatives. Journal of Applied Psychology, 87(1), 43-51.
 Barrick, M. R., Mitchell, T. R., & Stewart, G. L. (2003). Situational and motivational influences on trait– behavior relationships. In M. R.
 Bass, B. M. (1985). Leadership and performance beyond expectations. New York, NY: Free Press.
 Bass, B. M. (1990). Bass & Stogdill’s handbook of leadership: Theory, research, and managerial applications (3rd ed.). New York, NY, US: Free Press.
 Bass, B. M. & Bass, R. (2008). The Bass handbook of leadership: Theory, research, and managerial applications (4th ed.). New York: Free Press.
 Bass, B. M. and Riggio, R. E. (Eds.). (2006). Transformational Leadership (2nd ed). Mahwah,  NJ: Lawrence Erlbaum Associates.
 Blake, R.; Mouton, J. (1964). The Managerial Grid: The Key to Leadership Excellence.Houston: :Gulf Publishing Co..
 Cain, Susan. Quiet: The Power of Introverts in a World That Can't Stop Talking. New York: Crown, 2012. Print.
 
 Chen, G., Gully, S. M., Whiteman, J.-A., & Kilcullen, R. N. (2000). Examination of relationships among trait-like individual differences, state-like individual differences, and learning performance. Journal of Applied Psychology, 85(6), 835-847.
 Conger, J. A., & Kanungo, R. N. (1998). Charismatic leadership in organizations. Thousand Oaks, CA, US: Sage Publications, Inc.
 Cowley, W. H. (1931). The traits of face-to-face leaders. The Journal of Abnormal and Social Psychology, 26(3), 304-313.
 
 Derue, D. S., Nahrgang, J. D., Wellman, N., & Humphrey, S. E. (2011). Trait and behavioral theories - of leadership: An integration and :meta‐analytic test of their relative validity. Personnel Psychology, 4(1), 7-52.
 Fiedler, F. E. (1967). Style of leadership and performance of coaching groups. Zeitschrift für Experimentelle und Angewandte Psychologie, 14(2), 200-217.
 Galton, F. (1869). Hereditary genius. New York: Appleton.
 Hersey, P., & Blanchard K. H. (1969). Management of organizational behavior. Upper Saddle River, NJ: Prentice Hall.
 Hoffman, B. J., Woehr, D. J., Maldagen-Youngjohn, R., & Lyons, B. D. (2011). Great man or great myth? A quantitative review of the :relationship between individual differences and leader effectiveness. Journal of Occupational and Organizational Psychology, 84(2), 347-381.
 Hogan, R. (1983). A socioanalytic theory of personality. In M. M. Page (Ed.), 1982 Nebraska symposium on motivation (pp. 55−89). Lincoln, NE: University of Nebraska Press.
 Hogan, R. (1996). A socioanalytic perspective on the five-factor model. In J. S. Wiggins (Ed.), The five-factor model of personality (pp. 163−179). New York: Guilford Press.
 House, R. J., & Aditya, R. N. (1997). The social scientific study of leadership: Quo-vadis? Journal of Management, 23(3), 409-473.
 Hughes, R. L., Ginnett, R. C., & Curphy, G. J. (1996). Leadership. Boston: Irwin McGraw-Hill.
 Ilies, R., Arvey, R. D., & Bouchard, T. J. (2006). Darwinism, behavioral genetics, and organizational behavior, A review and agenda for future research. Journal of Organizational Behavior, 27(2), 121-141.
 Johnson, A. M., Vernon, P. A., Harris, J. A., & Jang, K. L. (2004). A behavioral investigation of the relationship between leadership and personality. Twin Research, 7, 27−32.
 Judge, T. A., Bono, J. E., Ilies, R., & Gerhardt, M. W. (2002). Personality and leadership: A qualitative and quantitative review. Journal of Applied Psychology, 87(4), 765-780.
 Judge, T. A., Colbert, A. E., & Ilies, R. (2004). Intelligence and Leadership: A Quantitative Review and Test of Theoretical Propositions. Journal of Applied Psychology, 89(3), 542-552.
 Judge, T. A., Piccolo, R. F., & Kosalka, T. (2009). The bright and dark sides of leader traits, A review and theoretical extension of the leader trait paradigm. The Leadership Quarterly, 20(6), 855-875.
 Judge, T. A., Woolf, E. F., Hurst, C., & Livingston, B. (2006). Charismatic and Transformational Leadership, A Review and an Agenda for Future Research. ill|Zeitschrift für Arbeits- und Organisationspsychologie A & O|de, 50(4), 203-214.
 Kanfer, R. (1990). Motivation theory and industrial and organizational psychology. In M. D. Dunnette & L. Hough (Eds.), Handbook of industrial and organizational psychology (2nd ed. Vol. 1, pp. 75–170). Palo Alto, CA: Consulting Psychologists Press.
 Kanfer, R. (1992). Work motivation: New directions in theory and research. In C. L. Cooper & I. T. Robertson (Eds.), International review of industrial and organizational psychology (Vol. 7, pp. 1–53). New York: Wiley.
 Kenny, D. A., & Zaccaro, S. J. (1983). An estimate of variance due to traits in leadership. Journal of Applied Psychology, 68(4), 678-685.
 Kirkpatrick, S. A., & Locke, E. A. (1996). Direct and indirect effects of three core charismatic leadership components on performance and :attitudes. Journal of Applied Psychology, 81(1), 36-51.
 Locke, E. A. (1991). The essence of leadership: The four keys to leading successfully. New York: Lexington Books.
 Lord, R. G., De Vader, C. L., & Alliger, G. M. (1986). A meta-analysis of the relation between personality traits and leadership perceptions: :An application of validity generalization procedures. Journal of Applied Psychology, 71, 402–410.
 Mann, R. D. (1959). A review of the relationship between personality and performance in small groups. Psychological Bulletin, 56, 241–270.
 McClelland, D. C., & Boyatzis, R. E. (1982). Leadership motive pattern and long-term success in management. Journal of Applied Psychology, 67(6), 737-743.
 Morgeson, F. P., & Ilies, R. (2007). Correlations between leadership traits and leadership styles. Unpublished raw data. Michigan State University, East Lansing, MI.
 Mumford, M. D., Zaccaro, S. J., Harding, F. D., Fleishman, E. A., & Reiter-Palmon, R. (1993). Cognitive and temperament predictors of executive ability: Principles for developing leadership capacity. Alexandria, VA: U.S. Army Research Institute for the Behavioral and Social Sciences.
 Mumford, M. D., Zaccaro, S. J., Harding, F. D., Jacobs, T. O., & Fleishman, E. A. (2000). Leadership skills for a changing world: Solving complex social problems. The Leadership Quarterly, 11(1), 11-35.
 Murphy, A. J. (1941). A study of the leadership process. American Sociological Review, 6, 674-687.
 Ng, K.-Y., Ang, S., & Chan, K.-Y. (2008). Personality and leader effectiveness: A moderated mediation model of leadership self-efficacy, job demands, and job autonomy. Journal of Applied Psychology, 93(4), 733-743.
 Podsakoff, P. M., MacKenzie, S. B., Moorman, R. H., & Fetter, R. (1990). Transformational leader behaviors and their effects on followers' trust in leader, satisfaction, and organizational citizenship behaviors. The Leadership Quarterly, 1(2), 107-142.
 Schaubroeck, J., Lam, S. S. K., & Cha, S. E. (2007). Embracing transformational leadership: Team values and the impact of leader behavior on :team performance. Journal of Applied Psychology, 92(4), 1020-1030.
 Schneider, R. J., Hough, L. M., & Dunnette, M. D. (1996). Broadsided by broad traits: How to sink science in five dimensions or less. Journal of Organizational Behavior, 17(6), 639-655.
 Stogdill, R. M. (1948). Personal factors associated with leadership: A survey of the literature. Journal of Psychology, 25, 35–71.
 Turkheimer, E. (2000). Three laws of behavior genetics and what they mean. Current Directions in Psychological Science, 9(5), 160-164.
 Yukl G. (2006). Leadership in organizations. Upper Saddle River, NJ: Prentice-Hall.
 Yukl, G., & Van Fleet, D. D. (1992). Theory and research on leadership in organizations. Handbook of industrial and organizational psychology, Vol. 3 (2nd ed.). (pp. 147–197). Palo Alto, CA, US: Consulting Psychologists Press.
 Zaccaro, S. J. (2001). The nature of executive leadership: A conceptual and empirical analysis of success. Washington, DC, US: American Psychological Association.
 Zaccaro, S. J. (2007). Trait-based perspectives of leadership. American Psychologist, 62(1), 6-16.
 Zaccaro, S. J., Kemp, C., & Bader, P. (2004). Leader traits and attributes. The nature of leadership. (pp. 101–124). Thousand Oaks, CA, US: :Sage Publications, Inc.

Leadership
Industrial and organizational psychology
Leadership studies